Cundeelee  is a small Aboriginal community  in Western Australia located  east of Perth and  east of Kalgoorlie in the Goldfields-Esperance region of Western Australia. At the 2006 census, Cundeelee had a population of 102.

A ration depot had been established in the area in 1939 followed by an Australian Aboriginal Evangelical Mission being set up in 1950. 
By 1952, the mission had attracted 130 people from the surrounding desert.

When surveyed in 1971 the community had 47 children at the mission school. Grants were awarded in 1973 to 1975 which allowed the mission to construct toilets, ablution blocks and a dam.

The community became incorporated in 1976 and took over the management of the town in 1978. At this time the community consisted of 50 people of European descent and 250 Indigenous Australians. Cundeelee was closed in the 1980s and most of the residents moved to Coonana. Some of the Aboriginal people moved back to their traditional lands at Cundeelee in 1984.

References 

Aboriginal communities in Goldfields-Esperance